Room for Rent may refer to the following:

 Room for Rent (1996 film), a Philippine romantic comedy film
 Room for Rent (2017 film), a Canadian comedy/mystery film
 Room for Rent (2019 film), an American mystery-horror film